Abu Qilqil Subdistrict  is a subdistrict of Manbij District in Aleppo Governorate of northern Syria. Administrative centre is the town of Abu Qilqil.

At the 2004 census, the subdistrict had a population of 47,109.

Cities, towns and villages

References 

Manbij District
Abu Qilqil